is a 2006 Japanese anime epic fantasy film co-written and directed by Gorō Miyazaki. It was animated by Studio Ghibli for the Nippon Television Network, Dentsu, Hakuhodo DY Media Partners, Buena Vista Home Entertainment, Mitsubishi and Toho, and distributed by the latter company. The film is based on a combination of plot and character elements from the first four books of Ursula K. Le Guin's Earthsea series (A Wizard of Earthsea, The Tombs of Atuan, The Farthest Shore, and Tehanu), as well as Hayao Miyazaki's manga series Shuna's Journey. The film's title is named from the collection of short stories Tales from Earthsea, published in 2001.

The film was released in Japan on July 29, 2006. It received mixed reviews from critics, who praised its animation but criticized the plot. According to the author, Ursula K. Le Guin, the plot was "entirely different" to that of her books. She told director Gorō Miyazaki, "It is not my book. It is your movie. It is a good movie", although she later expressed her disappointment with the end result. A film comic adaptation of the film has been published in Japan.

Plot
As a war galley sails through a storm, two dragons fight above the clouds, ending in one's death. In the kingdom of Enlad, the royal wizard Root proclaims the dragons to be a sign of a loss of balance in the world. The king is dealing with disease sweeping across his kingdom, and the disappearance of his son, Prince Arren. In the middle of the night, Arren kills his father, steals his father's sword, and flees the castle.

Arren travels through the desert and is rescued from wolves by the archmage Sparrowhawk. Together they travel to the city of Hort Town. When Arren explores the town alone, he rescues a young girl named Therru from slavers, but is later captured by the same slave master, Hare. His sword is dumped in the sea. Sparrowhawk rescues Arren from the slave caravan and takes him to a farm run by Sparrowhawk's oldest and greatest friend Tenar, who lives with Therru.

Sparrowhawk's intervention against Hare's slave caravan angers Lord Cob, a powerful warlock and the ruler of Hort Town, who wants the archmage brought to the castle. Meanwhile, Sparrowhawk tells Arren that he seeks a way to restore the upset balance, then resumes his search in Hort Town. While there he buys Arren's sword from a merchant's stall and manages to evade capture from Hare whilst learning about Cob's castle.

Arren confesses to Therru that he killed his father and that he feels an unknown presence following him. Because of this, Arren leaves the farm, but is met by the presence, which is a mirror image of himself. Arren falls unconscious after stumbling into a swamp while fleeing from the image. Cob takes him to the castle, where he manipulates Arren into revealing his "true name", Prince Lebannen, to control him. Meanwhile, Hare captures Tenar as bait to lure Sparrowhawk into the castle, leaving Therru tied to a post as a messenger. She frees herself, and encounters Sparrowhawk, who gives her Arren's sword to give to Arren. Sparrowhawk breaks into the castle to save Tenar and confronts Cob. Sparrowhawk learns that Cob is causing the world's balance to collapse by opening the door between life and death to try and gain eternal life. Sparrowhawk tries to warn Cob of the dangers of upsetting the balance, and Cob sends Arren out to kill him. Sparrowhawk frees the prince from Cob's control but is captured by Hare after being weakened.

Meanwhile, Therru sees the duplicate of Arren and follows him to the castle, where he reveals that he is the light within Arren and tells Therru his true name. Therru enters the castle and learns of Sparrowhawk and Tenar's sunrise execution. She finds Arren, guilty and hopeless, and brings hope back to him, calling him by his true name and confiding in him her own true name, Tehanu. They rush to rescue Sparrowhawk and Tenar. Arren confronts Cob, who tries to kill him. He fights back and finally unsheathes his sword, which was sealed with magic. Arren cuts off Cob's staff-holding hand. Unable to use any of his magic powers, Cob rapidly begins to age. He captures Therru and flees to the highest tower of the castle, with Arren in pursuit. Cornering Cob, Arren tries to explain what he learned about life and death from Therru and Sparrowhawk to Cob, but the withering Dark Lord refuses to listen and uses the last of his magic to strangle Therru to death. Instead of dying, she reveals her true form as a dragon, possessing everlasting life. Therru kills Cob with her fire breath and rescues Arren from the collapsing tower.

Sparrowhawk and Tenar leave the castle while Therru and Arren land in a field where Therru changes back into a human. Arren tells Therru he will leave for home to repent for his crime, but will come back to see her some day. After he and Therru reunite with Sparrowhawk and Tenar, the four of them spend time together. Arren and Sparrowhawk depart for Enlad, bidding Therru and Tenar goodbye. Therru looks up to see her fellow dragons airborne, indicating that the balance of the world has been restored.

Cast
 Bunta Sugawara (Timothy Dalton in the English Dub) as Ged/Sparrowhawk, a famous, powerful, wise, and noble sorcerer of Earthsea, known as the Archmage, who is trying to solve the mystery on why the world's Balance is collapsing. He acts as a father-figure to Arren.
 Junichi Okada (Matt Levin in the English Dub) as Prince Arren/Lebannen, a seventeen-year-old boy who is followed by a shadow due to his fear of death and the darkness in his heart caused by the collapse of the Balance of the world itself.
 Aoi Teshima (Blaire Restaneo in the English Dub) as Therru/Tehanu, a burn victim who, like Prince Arren, is also seventeen. She was abused and abandoned by her birth parents until Tenar took her in. She originally thought of Arren as a monster after he saved her from Hare, because he seemed to lack any respect for life, but came to fall in love with him when she saw his compassion.
 Jun Fubuki (Mariska Hargitay in the English Dub) as Tenar, Sparrowhawk's old friend. When she and Sparrowhawk were young, she was a priestess at the Tombs of Atuan until Sparrowhawk guided her to freedom. She raised Therru on her own and accepted Arren and Sparrowhawk into her and Therru's home with open arms.
 Yūko Tanaka (Willem Dafoe in the English Dub) as Cob, a maniacal warlock. Years ago, Sparrowhawk defeated him before he could attempt to control the dead and was, therefore, banished to the Wastelands. Eventually, he escaped and upset the world's Balance in order to try and to gain eternal life.
 Teruyuki Kagawa (Cheech Marin in the English Dub) as Hare, Cob's head slaver. Despite being somewhat bumbling and cowardly, he is very loyal to Cob and takes his slaver job seriously.
 Kaoru Kobayashi (Brian George in the English Dub) as the King of Enlad and Arren's father. He cares for his kingdom and its well-being.
 Yui Natsukawa (Susanne Blakeslee in the English Dub) as the Queen of Enlad and Arren's mother. She is very strict and believes that Arren is old enough to take care of himself.
 Mitsuko Baisho (Kat Cressida in the English Dub) as a Cloak Vendor, a middle-aged woman who according to herself, used to be a sorceress. Due to the world's Balance collapsing and the people's failing belief in magic, she lost her magic and was reduced to selling cloaks.
 Takashi Naito (Jess Harnell in the English Dub) as the Hazia Dealer, who attempted to make Prince Arren try some Hazia, until Sparrowhawk intervened due to its addictive qualities.

Production
This feature film from Studio Ghibli is the first anime film adaptation of any part of the Earthsea series. In the past, many directors, including Hayao Miyazaki, had tried to adapt the Earthsea cycle for film, but were disapproved by the author herself. When Le Guin first heard of Miyazaki's interest in adapting her work, she had not seen any of his films and associated animation with the output of Disney, so she turned down his request.

In 2003, after winning an Oscar for his film Spirited Away, Hayao Miyazaki received Le Guin's approval but was busy directing Howl's Moving Castle. Studio Ghibli head Toshio Suzuki decided that Hayao's son Gorō Miyazaki, who was advising on the film, should be given his first directing job for the adaptation. Hayao was dissatisfied with the decision, thinking that Gorō lacked the necessary experience. They reportedly did not speak to one another during production of the film. Hayao later acknowledged his son's work upon its first preview. Some feel that a major section of the plot was adapted from the director's father, Hayao Miyazaki's Shuna's Journey graphic novel, with many direct references. Le Guin, who had become a devoted fan of Hayao Miyazaki's work following their first encounter and had wished for him to direct the film, was also disappointed by the selection of Gorō as director, but was told by Studio Ghibli that Hayao would oversee the film's production.

Music
The soundtrack for Tales from Earthsea was composed and managed by Tamiya Terashima and was released by Tokuma Japan Communications and Studio Ghibli Records as a multichannel hybrid SACD-CD on 12 July 2006. Carlos Núñez was a key collaborator on the soundtrack, contributing his ocarina, whistle and Galician gaita (bagpipe) to 11 of the 21 tracks. Newcomer singer, Aoi Teshima, sang in 2 of the tracks. A follow-up album, "Melodies from Gedo Senki", was released on 17 January 2007 and included unreleased Gedo Senki OST tracks and new tracks by Núñez.

Release

Theatrical 
Tales from Earthsea was released in Japan on July 29, 2006. Studio Ghibli released the first and second trailers on its official web site. A three-minute Japanese trailer was first shown in Japanese cinemas starting Saturday 24 February 2006. It was aired on NTV on 23 February 2006 (the day the trailer was completed). Theo Le Guin, Ursula K. Le Guin's son, viewed the Japanese trailer and said this of it: "The images are really beautiful. The song too, it's not like something from Hollywood, but felt really like Ghibli." The trailers were made by Keiichi Itagaki, who had been responsible for trailers for all of the other Ghibli films up until then.

In Australia, Tales from Earthsea premiered in Brisbane on 15 April 2007. The film began a single print tour of major cities on 25 April 2007 and ended up playing at locations in Brisbane, Sydney, Melbourne, Adelaide and Perth over the following months. It was notable that, unlike previous Studio Ghibli releases, only a subtitled version was seen in cinemas.

The film was released in selected UK cinemas on 3 August 2007 by Optimum Releasing, in both subtitled and English dubbed versions. The film was not released as widely as previous Ghibli movies, playing to 23 venues across the nation and making an unremarkable £23,300. Reviews were generally positive, but received mixed reviews when it was compared to the past Ghibli films. Radio Times suggested that it "lacks the technical sheen and warm sentimentality of some of Ghibli's earlier films", while the Daily Mirror called it "ploddy, excruciatingly slow" and not in the same league as the work of Hayao Miyazaki. However, Empire magazine said it was "well worth watching" while The Guardian called it "An engaging piece of work".

In Spain, Tales from Earthsea premiered only in Madrid and Barcelona in two small theaters on 28 December 2007 by Aurum, only in a Japanese version with subtitles (an odd theatrical release compared to previous Ghibli movies).

Walt Disney Studios Motion Pictures released the film in the United States on August 13, 2010 under the Walt Disney Studios banner. Unlike their release of Ponyo the previous year, Disney opted to give the film a limited release in only five theaters. The film was rated PG-13 by the Motion Picture Association of America for some violent images, making it the first and only animated film released under Disney's name receive a PG-13 rating. It is also the second Studio Ghibli film to receive this rating after Princess Mononoke (The Wind Rises, the third PG-13 film from Studio Ghibli, was distributed under Disney's Touchstone Pictures banner). The reason for the movie's longer-than-usual release in North America was due to a existing non-compete arrangement with RHI Entertainment, who at the time held the North American rights to Earthsea adaptations and produced the miniseries of the same name. RHI (at the time, Hallmark Entertainment) granted a specific rights reversion for Studio Ghibli in 2004 that allowed them to produce the animated movie, with the rights not expiring until December 2008.

Home entertainment

Japan
The movie was released on DVD and VHS in Japan by Buena Vista Home Entertainment on July 4, 2007. The DVD included the movie with both the original Japanese soundtrack and English dub, alongside a selection of bonus features. A Special Edition 4-DVD set was also released on the same day, which featured extra language tracks, and more bonus features.

Walt Disney Studios Japan released the film on Blu-ray Disc on November 16, 2011. The company later reissued the DVD with the HD remaster on April 20, 2022.

International
A 2-disc DVD was released on 12 September 2007 in Australia by Madman Entertainment, this time featuring both the English and Japanese versions.

Optimum Releasing released both the subtitled and dub, region 2 DVD for the UK market on 28 January 2008. To mark the release, HMV ran frequent sponsor credits for the DVD, as well as a prize competition, on the AnimeCentral channel. StudioCanal UK released the film on Blu-ray on June 25, 2012.

In the United States, Walt Disney Studios Home Entertainment released the film on DVD on March 8, 2011. The company later released the movie on Blu-ray Disc on February 3, 2015. GKIDS re-issued the film on Blu-ray and DVD on February 6, 2018 under a new deal with Studio Ghibli.

A single DVD and a special 2-disc DVD were released by Aurum on 12 March 2008, this time with a Spanish soundtrack included.

Reception

Box office
The film reached No. 1 at the Japanese box office on its opening week, with a gross of over 900 million yen, or 7.7 million USD, pushing Pirates of the Caribbean: Dead Man's Chest to second place and becoming the number one movie in the country for five weeks. , it has grossed  in Japan and  worldwide.

Critical response
During a private screening prior to the film's release, Gorō's father, Hayao, was asked what he thought of the film. He said, "I was looking at my kid. He's not an adult yet. That is all."

In the early 1980s, animator and director Hayao Miyazaki asked Ursula K. Le Guin, the author of the Earthsea series, for permission to create an animated adaptation of Earthsea. Le Guin, who was unfamiliar with his work and anime in general, turned down the offer. Years later, after seeing My Neighbor Totoro, she reconsidered her refusal, believing that if anyone should be allowed to direct an Earthsea film, it should be Miyazaki. The film was ultimately directed by Miyazaki's son Gorō, rather than Miyazaki himself, which disappointed Le Guin. While she was positive about the aesthetic of the film, writing that "much of it was beautiful", she took great issue with its reimagining of the books' moral sense and its greater focus on physical violence. "[E]vil has been comfortably externalized in a villain", Le Guin writes, "the wizard Kumo/Cob, who can simply be killed, thus solving all problems. In modern fantasy (literary or governmental), killing people is the usual solution to the so-called war between good and evil. My books are not conceived in terms of such a war, and offer no simple answers to simplistic questions."

She stated that the plot departed so greatly from her story that she was "watching an entirely different story, confusingly enacted by people with the same names as in my story". She also praised certain depictions of nature in the film but felt that its production values were not as high as previous works directed by Hayao Miyazaki, and that the film's excitement was focused too much around scenes of violence. Her initial response to Gorō Miyazaki was, "It is not my book. It is your movie. It is a good movie". However, she stated that the comment disclosed on the movie's public blog did not portray her true feelings about the film's vast departure from original stories; "taking bits and pieces out of context, and replacing the storylines with an entirely different plot..."

Le Guin's mixed opinion of the film is indicative of the film's overall reception, particularly in Japan, where it found both strong proponents and detractors. Many of the opinions can be characterized by a response to Le Guin's comments on her website—that the film's weak points were the result of "when too much responsibility was shouldered by someone not equipped for it".

The critical reception in Japan was favorable but mixed when compared to that of other Ghibli movies. Miyazaki was presented Japan's Bunshun Raspberry Award for "Worst Director", with Tales from Earthsea receiving the award for "Worst Movie" at the end of 2006. It was nominated in 2007 for the Japan Academy Prize for Animation of the Year (losing to The Girl Who Leapt Through Time) and was selected in the Out of Competition section at the 63rd Venice Film Festival.

Rotten Tomatoes reported that 40% of critics have given the film a positive review based on 40 critics with an average rating of 5.2/10. It was the lowest-rated film produced by Studio Ghibli on the website, up until Earwig and the Witch (2020) which was also directed by Gorō. On Metacritic, it has a weighted average score of 47 out of 100 based on 11 critic reviews, indicating "mixed or average reviews".

References

Further reading

External links
  
  
 
 
 
 
 
 Tales from Earthsea at Metacritic
 
 Gorō Miyazaki's Director's Blog  (translation)
 Film synopsis  at Ursula K. Le Guin's Web site
 Official Hong Kong movie Web site

Tales From Earthsea (Film)
2006 anime films
2006 fantasy films
2000s Japanese-language films
2006 directorial debut films
2006 films
Adaptations of works by Ursula K. Le Guin
Animated films about dragons
Animated films based on American novels
Anime films based on novels
Dragons in popular culture
Japanese fantasy adventure films
Fiction about murder
Fiction about regicide
Films based on American novels
Films based on fantasy novels
Films based on multiple works of a series
Films directed by Gorō Miyazaki
Films set in castles
High fantasy anime and manga
High fantasy films
Nippon TV films
Japanese animated fantasy films
Patricide in fiction
Studio Ghibli animated films
Theft in fiction
Toho animated films